Usta subangulata is a species of moth in the  family Saturniidae. It is found in Tanzania, Kenya, the Democratic Republic of the Congo, Mozambique, Malawi, Ethiopia, Uganda and Zambia.

Taxonomy
Usta subangulata is treated as a subspecies of Usta terpsichore by some sources. Furthermore, Usta grantae is either treated as a full species, a subspecies or synonym of Usta subangulata or a subspecies of Usta terpsichore.

References

Moths described in 1930
subangulata
Insects of Tanzania
Moths of Africa